The women's shot put event at the 2011 All-Africa Games was held on 15 September.

Results

References
Results
Results

Shot
2011 in women's athletics